is a railway station in the city of  Gamagōri, Aichi Prefecture, Japan, operated by Central Japan Railway Company (JR Tōkai).

Lines
Mikawa-Shiotsu Station is served by the Tōkaidō Main Line, and is located 312.9 kilometers from the starting point of the line at Tokyo Station.

Station layout
The station has two opposed side platforms connected to the elevated station building by a footbridge. The station building has automated ticket machines, TOICA automated turnstiles and is unattended.

Platforms

Adjacent stations

Station history
Mikawa-Shiotsu Station was opened on 16 November 1988.

Station numbering was introduced to the section of the Tōkaidō Line operated JR Central in March 2018; Mikawa-Shiotsu Station was assigned station number CA48.

Passenger statistics
In fiscal 2017, the station was used by an average of 1372 passengers daily (boarding passengers only).

Surrounding area
Shiotsu Elementary School
Japan National Route 23

See also
 List of Railway Stations in Japan

References

Yoshikawa, Fumio. Tokaido-sen 130-nen no ayumi. Grand-Prix Publishing (2002) .

External links

Railway stations in Japan opened in 1988
Railway stations in Aichi Prefecture
Tōkaidō Main Line
Stations of Central Japan Railway Company
Gamagōri, Aichi